TRDR Pocket is an Android-based handheld game console, released in 2021. It has a single, capacitive touch screen, and is optimized for running Android software.

Software 
Android 10 is installed as standard, including a Metro-inspired launcher, game emulators and entertainment apps like Netflix and TikTok.

Soulja Boy partnership 
The console, developed by tech entrepreneur Gianni O'Connor, was released in partnership with Soulja Boy. The rapper's SouljaGame brand has released several consoles over the years, including the Retro SouljaBoy Mini and the SouljaGame Fuze.

References 

Android (operating system) devices
Handheld game consoles
Products introduced in 2021

ARM-based video game consoles